Justin Snith (born December 8, 1991 in Calgary, Alberta) is a Canadian luger who has competed since 2008. He has three Luge World Cup doubles podium finishes.

Snith qualified for the 2010 Winter Olympics with Tristan Walker, where he finished 15th. Snith also qualified for the 2014 Winter Olympics in Sochi, Russia. He competed in both the doubles race and the team relay (which made its Olympic début in 2014). He and his teammate Tristan Walker missed the podium in the doubles event by just five-hundredths (0.05) of a second for the best-ever Olympic result by a Canadian sled in the event. They joined Alex Gough and Samuel Edney and had another Olympic fourth-place finish. The team won silver at the 2013 World Championships, following bronze in 2012.

2022 Olympics
In January 2022, Snith was named to Canada's 2022 Olympic team.

References

 FIL-Luge profile

External links
 
 
 
 

1991 births
Canadian male lugers
Living people
Lugers at the 2010 Winter Olympics
Lugers at the 2014 Winter Olympics
Lugers at the 2018 Winter Olympics
Lugers at the 2022 Winter Olympics
Olympic lugers of Canada
Medalists at the 2018 Winter Olympics
Olympic silver medalists for Canada
Olympic medalists in luge
Lugers from Calgary